The Arado E.581-4 was a German flying wing bomber project. It had three landing gears, and an unusually low fuselage.

History
The aircraft was originally designed as the Arado E.555, and a scaled down version was designed in 1944, developing into this craft. Production was never completed however as it was dropped in favour of maximising production of existing designs.

Specifications

References

German bomber aircraft
Arado aircraft